Bill Heindl Sr. (May 16, 1922 – April 13, 1979) was a Canadian ice hockey defenceman who played on two Memorial Cup Championships.

Heindl was born in Winnipeg, Manitoba.

His son, Bill Heindl Jr., played in the NHL.

Awards and achievements
Turnbull Cup MJHL Championship (1941 & 1942)
Memorial Cup Championship (1941 & 1942)
QSHL Second All-Star Team (1950)
WCSHL First All-Star Team (1951)
"Honoured Member" of the Manitoba Hockey Hall of Fame

In 2004, Bill Heindl was inducted into the Manitoba Sports Hall of Fame.

External links

Bill Heindl Sr.'s biography at Manitoba Hockey Hall of Fame

1922 births
1979 deaths
Canadian ice hockey defencemen
Portage Terriers players
Ice hockey people from Winnipeg
Manitoba Sports Hall of Fame inductees